Karkevand (also known as Garkevand) is a city in the Central District of Mobarakeh County, Isfahan Province, Iran.  At the 2006 census, its population was 7,002, in 1,891 families.

References

Populated places in Mobarakeh County

Cities in Isfahan Province